Donderskamp (Kalina: Konomerume) is an indigenous village of Kalina Amerindians in the resort of Boven Coppename in the Sipaliwini District in Suriname. The village is located on the Wayambo River.

History
The origin of the name is unclear. It may refer to Peter Donders who, in 1868, was the first missionary active among the Wayambo-indians, or it may simply refer to "thunder".

The village has a school, a clinic, and is home to a holiday resort. The main source of income for the village is growing arrowleaf elephant ear for pom, a popular dish in Suriname.

The Kalina language used to be spoken by the tribe, however as of 2014, it is only spoken by the elderly, and Sranan Tongo and Dutch have become the main languages.

Transport
The village can be reached by boat from the Wayambo River, or by plane via the Donderskamp Airstrip.

References

Bibliography
 
 

Indigenous villages in Suriname
Populated places in Sipaliwini District